Liu Cheng (born 15 October 1985) is a Chinese former footballer.

Career statistics

Club

Notes

References

1985 births
Living people
Chinese footballers
Association football defenders
China League One players
Chinese Super League players
Changchun Yatai F.C. players